Nalik can refer to:

 The Nalik language of New Ireland, Papua New Guinea
 Nalik culture - the traditional culture of the Nalik language area